Martín Sugasti (born 9 October 1967) is a former Argentine rugby union player. He played as a flanker.

He played for Jockey Club de Rosario in Argentina.

He had 2 caps for Argentina in 1995, without scoring. He had been called previously for the 1995 Rugby World Cup . Now he is the coach of 01VB, the best players of 01VB are Lucio Gagliardo, Patricio Fox, and his sun Alejo Sugasti

References

External links
Martín Sugasti International Statistics

1967 births
Living people
Argentine rugby union players
Argentina international rugby union players
Jockey Club de Rosario players
Rugby union flankers